Sherard is both a surname and a given name. Notable people with the name include:

Surname
 Bennet Sherard (disambiguation), multiple people
 James Sherard (1666–1738), English apothecary, botanist and amateur musician
 Michael Sherard (1910–1998), British fashion designer
 Philip Sherard (disambiguation), multiple people
 Robert Sherard (1861–1943), English writer and journalist
 William Sherard (disambiguation), multiple people

Given name
 Sherard Cowper-Coles (born 1955), British diplomat
 Lord Sherard Manners (–1742), English nobleman and Member of Parliament 
 Sherard Osborn Cowper-Coles (1866–1936), British metallurgist and grandfather of Sherard Cowper-Coles
 Sherard Osborn (1822–1875), British Royal Navy admiral and explorer
 Sherard Parker (born 1980), Canadian actor
 Sherard Vines (1890–1974), English writer and academic

See also
Sherrard (name)